Love Songs is a compilation album by American jazz musician Miles Davis, released on February 2, 1999, by Sony Music Records. The songs it compiles were recorded between May 10, 1957, and February 12, 1964.

Critical reception 
Robert Christgau, writing in The Village Voice, gave Love Songs an "A" and said that "Miles's quiet cool and taciturn affection for the limits of the melody at hand" summons a "consensual intimacy" that "definitely won't kill the mood." Matt Robinson of All About Jazz felt that it explores Davis' "trademark poise and lyricism" that was best expressed in ballads and credited the compilation for "revealing a diversity even in the broad unity of the love song." Q magazine gave it four out of five stars and stated, "The master of the art, Davis could push an entire universe of fragility into a simple love song and play the trumpet with such disarming candour it hurt".

In a mixed review for Allmusic, Scott Yanow gave the album two-and-a-half stars and said that, because of "the slow tempos and the lack of variety in moods, this set is really designed more for background music than for close listening." In The Rolling Stone Album Guide (2004), J. D. Considine gave Love Songs three-and-a-half out of five stars and found it "quite sweet" for a "theme-oriented collection".

Track listing 
"I Fall in Love Too Easily" (Cahn, Styne) – 6:48
"I Thought About You" (Mercer, VanHeusen) – 4:56
"Summer Night" (Dubin, Warren) – 6:05
"My Ship" (Gershwin, Weill) – 4:34
"Someday My Prince Will Come" (Churchill, Morey) – 9:09
"Stella by Starlight" (Washington, Young) – 4:51
"My Funny Valentine" (Hart, Rodgers) – 15:09
"I Loves You, Porgy" (Gershwin, Gershwin, Heyward) – 3:40
"Old Folks" (Hill, Robison) – 5:17

Personnel

Cannonball Adderley – alto saxophone
George Avakian – producing
Danny Bank – bass clarinet
Bob Belden – producing
Joe Bennett – trombone
Frank Butler – drums
Johnny Carisi – trumpet
Ron Carter – bass
Paul Chambers – bass
Jimmy Cleveland – trombone
Jimmy Cobb – drums
George Coleman – tenor saxophone
John Coltrane – tenor saxophone
Sid Cooper – clarinet, flute
Miles Davis – trumpet
Gil Evans – arranging, conducting
Victor Feldman – piano
Howard Fritzson – art direction
Bernie Glow – trumpet
Herbie Hancock – piano
Dick Hixon – trombone

Don Hunstein – photography
Taft Jordan – trumpet
Wynton Kelly – piano
Lee Konitz – alto saxophone
Cal Lampley – producing
Teo Macero – producing
Randall Martin – cover design
Tony Miranda – French horn
Hank Mobley – tenor saxophone
Louis Mucci – trumpet
Romeo Penque – clarinet, bass clarinet, flute, alto flute
Frank Rehak – trombone
Jerome Richardson – clarinet, flute, alto flute
Seth Rothstein – producing
Ernie Royal – trumpet
Willie Ruff – French horn
Gunther Schuller – French horn
Bill Steele – photography
Art Taylor – drums
Julius Watkins – French horn

Charts

References

Bibliography

External links 
 

1999 compilation albums
Albums produced by George Avakian
Albums produced by Bob Belden
Albums produced by Cal Lampley
Albums produced by Teo Macero
Miles Davis compilation albums
Sony Records albums
Albums recorded at CBS 30th Street Studio